Polar ice pack may refer to:

Arctic ice pack
Antarctic sea ice
Drift ice